Mercer Street may refer to:

Mercer Street, London
Mercer Street (Manhattan)
Mercer Street (Seattle)
Mercer Street Historic District, Princeton, West Virginia
MT Mercer Street, the oil tanker involved in the 2021 Gulf of Oman incident